Struijk is a Dutch surname. Notable people with the surname include:

 Michelle Struijk (born 1998), Belgian field hockey player
 Pascal Struijk (born 1999), Belgian-born Dutch footballer
 Frank van der Struijk (born 1985), Dutch footballer

Dutch-language surnames